Cedrick Bowen (born September 5, 1992) is an American professional basketball player for Álftanes of the Icelandic 1. deild karla. He played college basketball at Charleston Southern Buccaneers from 2011 to 2015.

College career
Bowen played for Charleston Southern University  from 2011 to 2015. In 31 games during his senior year, he averaged 7.9 points and 4.1 rebounds.

Professional career
After graduating, on October 15, 2015, Bowen signed with Studentski Centar Podgorica from Montenegro.

He signed with reigning Icelandic champions KR Basket prior to the 2016–17 Úrvalsdeild karla season. In end of January 2017, the club released him after averaging 13.2 points and 6.8 rebounds per game in 13 games. On February 3, 2017 he signed with rival Úrvalsdeild club Haukar from Hafnarfjörður for the rest of the season as a backup for Finnur Atli Magnússon and Sherrod Wright. In six games for the club, he averaged 5.7 points, 3.8 rebounds and 1.2 assists.

On August 30, 2017, he signed with Spartak Pleven. On December 8, 2017, he signed with Academic Plovdiv but after one month he part ways with the Bulgarian club. On January 7, 2018, he signed with Macedonian basketball club Blokotehna. On January 13, 2018, he made his debut for Blokotehna, scoring 14 points and eight rebounds in a 91–54 win over the Kožuv. In his first match for Blokotehna in BIBL he scored 12 points and six rebounds in a 75–91 away win against Bashkimi Prizren.

In July 2020, Bowen signed with 1. deild karla club Álftanes.

References

External links
Eurobasket.com Profile
Charleston Southern Buccaneers bio
RealGM Profile

1992 births
Living people
American expatriate basketball people in Bulgaria
American expatriate basketball people in Iceland
American expatriate basketball people in North Macedonia
American men's basketball players
Álftanes men's basketball players
BC Šiauliai players
Charleston Southern Buccaneers men's basketball players
Forwards (basketball)
KK Studentski centar players
Haukar men's basketball players
Basketball players from Marietta, Georgia
Úrvalsdeild karla (basketball) players